are a style of Japanese playing cards. They are typically smaller than Western playing cards, only , but thicker and stiffer. On the face of each card is a depiction of plants, tanzaku (短冊), animals, birds, or man-made objects. One single card depicts a human. The back side is usually plain, without a pattern or design of any kind, and traditionally coloured either red or black. Hanafuda are used to play a variety of games including Koi-Koi and Hachi-Hachi.

In Korea, hanafuda are known as Hwatu (Korean: 화투, Hanja: , "battle of flowers") and made of plastic with a textured back side. The most popular games are Go-stop (Korean: 고스톱) and Seotda (Korean: 섯다). Hwatu is very commonly played in South Korea during special holidays such as Lunar New Year and Chuseok (추석).

In Hawaii, hanafuda is used to play Sakura. Hanafuda is also played in Micronesia, where it is known as Hanahuda and is used to play a four-person game, which is often paired cross-table.

History

Playing cards were introduced to Japan by the Portuguese in the mid-16th century. The Portuguese deck consisted of 48 cards, with four suits divided into 12 ranks. The first Japanese-made decks made during the Tenshō period (1573–1592) mimicked Portuguese decks and are referred to as Tenshō Karuta. The main game was a trick-taking game intermediate in evolution between Triunfo and Ombre. After Japan closed off all contact with the Western world in 1633, foreign playing cards were banned.

In 1648, Tenshō Karuta were banned by the Tokugawa shogunate. During prohibition, gambling with cards remained highly popular which led to disguised card designs. Each time gambling with a card deck of a particular design became too popular, the government banned it, which then prompted the creation of a new design. This cat-and-mouse game between the government and rebellious gamblers resulted in the creation of increasingly abstract and minimalist regional patterns (地方札). These designs were initially called Yomi Karuta after the popular Poch-like game of Yomi which was known by the 1680s.

Through the Meiwa, An'ei, and Tenmei eras (roughly 1764–1789), a game called Mekuri took the place of Yomi. It became so popular that Yomi Karuta was renamed Mekuri Karuta. Mechanically, Mekuri is similar to Chinese fishing games. Cards became so commonly used for gambling that they were banned in 1791, during the Kansei era.

The earliest known reference to Hana Awase (a previous version of hanafuda) is from 1816 when it was recorded as a banned gambling tool. Unlike earlier decks it consists of 12 months (suits) divided into four rank-like categories. The majority of hanafuda games are descended from Mekuri although Yomi adaptations for the flower cards survived until the 20th century. Though they can still be used for gambling, its structure and design is less convenient than other decks such as Kabufuda. In the Meiji period, playing cards became tolerated by the authorities.

In 1889, Fusajiro Yamauchi founded Nintendo for the purposes of producing and selling hand-crafted hanafuda. Nintendo has focused on video games since the 1970s but continues to produce cards in Japan, including themed sets based on Mario, Pokémon, and Kirby. The Koi-Koi game played with hanafuda is included in Nintendo's own Clubhouse Games (2006) for the Nintendo DS, and Clubhouse Games: 51 Worldwide Classics (2020) for the Nintendo Switch.

Hanafuda were likely introduced to Korea during the late 1890s and to Hawaii in the early 1900s.

Cards
There are 48 cards total, divided into twelve suits, representing months of the year. Each suit is designated by a flower and has four cards. An extra blank card may be included to serve as a replacement. In Korean Hwatu decks, several joker cards (조커패) award various bonuses.

The standard categorizations and point values for each card are as follows. Note that some games change the point values or categorizations of the cards. For example, in the game Hachi-Hachi, all of the November cards count as kasu, and in the game Sakura, the values of the cards are different.

※ In the Korean Hwatu version, the November and December suits are swapped.

Text significance 
A few cards in hanafuda contain Japanese text. In addition to the examples below, the December kasu cards typically display the manufacturer's name and marks, similar to the Ace of spades in western playing cards.

Games

Mekuri-derived games:
Hana Awase
Minhwatu
Koi-Koi
Sakura
Go-Stop
Roppyakken
Mushi
Hachi
Hachi-hachi
Sudaoshi
Tensho

Yomi-derived games:
Poka
Hiyoko
Isuri

Gabo Japgi/Kabufuda-derived games:
Seotda
Doryjytgo-ttang

See also
 :Category:Films about hanafuda
 :Category:Hanafuda manufacturers
 Kabufuda
 Karuta
 Uta-garuta

Notes

References

External links

Hanafuda rules
Commentary on Hanafuda cards, including Korean variants

19th-century card games
Hawaii culture
Japanese card games
Japanese games
Korean card games
Korean games
Micronesian culture
Playing card decks